Jesper Jørgensen (born 10 March 1983) is a Danish former footballer who played as a striker.

Career

Jorgensen started his senior career with Boldklubben Frem in 2004. In 2005, he signed for AGF in the Danish Superliga where he made eight appearances and scored zero goals. After that, he played for Danish club Kolding FC, before being signed by Irish club Galway United. He later played for Danish clubs Greve Fodbold and Kolding Boldklub before retiring.

References 

1983 births
Living people
Danish expatriate men's footballers
Galway United F.C. players
Boldklubben Frem players
Association football forwards
Danish men's footballers
Aarhus Gymnastikforening players
Greve Fodbold players
Kolding FC players
Expatriate association footballers in the Republic of Ireland
Danish expatriate sportspeople in Ireland
Danish Superliga players
Danish 1st Division players
Danish 2nd Division players
League of Ireland players
Lyngby Boldklub players
Footballers from Copenhagen